Edmen Shahbazyan (born November 20, 1997) is an American mixed martial artist competing in the middleweight division of the Ultimate Fighting Championship (UFC).

Background
Edmen Shahbazyan fights out of Glendale, California. His older brother, Leon, is also a professional fighter. Edmen started training in martial arts at the age of 9 and trained at his former gym Glendale Fighting Club since the age of 12. As a teenager, he served as a training partner for Ronda Rousey. Shahbazyan initially attended Glendale High School, but transferred to Herbert Hoover High School from where he graduated. During his time in Hoover High, he wrestled and reached the CIF State Wrestling Championship tournament.

Mixed martial arts career

Early career
Shahbazyan made his professional debut in mixed martial arts on February 25, 2017 at CXF 6. He faced Selah Williams and won by technical knockout in the first round. Edmen continued fighting for mixed martial arts promotions in California and compiled a 6–0 record, winning all fights by first-round knockout.

Shahbazyan was invited to participate on Dana White's Contender Series 13 of Dana White's Contender Series. Edmen faced Antonio Jones, winning by technical knockout only 40 seconds into the first round. His performance led to White offering him a contract to fight in the UFC.

Edmen was formerly managed by Ronda Rousey's One Fight Management.

Ultimate Fighting Championship
Shahbazyan debuted in the UFC on November 30, 2018 at The Ultimate Fighter 28 Finale against Darren Stewart. He won the fight via split decision.

Shahbazyan's next fight was against Charles Byrd at UFC 235. He won the fight by first-round knockout.

Shahbazyan faced Jack Marshman on July 6, 2019 at UFC 239. He won the fight via a rear-naked choke submission in the first round.

Shahbazyan was expected to face Krzysztof Jotko on November 2, 2019 at UFC 244. However, Jotko withdrew from the bout and was replaced by Brad Tavares. After initially knocking Tavares down via a punch, Shahbazyan won the fight via a head kick KO in the first round.

Shahbazyan was expected to face Derek Brunson on March 7, 2020 at UFC 248. However it was announced on February 20 that the bout had been rescheduled and would take place on April 11, 2020 at UFC Fight Night: Overeem vs. Harris. Due to the COVID-19 pandemic, the event was postponed and eventually scheduled for August 1, 2020 at UFC Fight Night: Brunson vs. Shahbazyan. Shahbazyan lost the fight via technical knockout in round three.

During the walkout Shahbazyan carried a flag of Nagorno-Karabakh Republic, an internationally unrecognized regime. This was done in support after minor clashes took place in the area during that time. After the bout, the Consul General of Azerbaijan in Los Angeles Nasimi Aghayev sent a protest regarding the incident to the UFC. As an outcome Shahbazyan apologized to the UFC for breaking the rules and causing controversy, and also lost his Reebok sponsor money.

Shahbazyan was scheduled to face Jack Hermansson on May 15, 2021  at UFC 262. However, for unknown reasons the bout was postponed and took place at UFC Fight Night: Font vs. Garbrandt on May 22, 2021. He lost the bout via unanimous decision after being dominated by Hermansson's grappling in rounds 2 and 3.

Shahbazyan faced Nassourdine Imavov on November 6, 2021 at UFC 268. He lost the fight via TKO due to elbows from crucifix position in round two.

Shahbazyan face Dalcha Lungiambula on December 10, 2022, at UFC 282. He won the fight via technical knockout in round two. This win earned him the Performance of the Night award.

Shahbazyan is scheduled to face Anthony Hernandez on May 20, 2023 at UFC Fight Night 225.

Championships and accomplishments

Mixed martial arts
 Ultimate Fighting Championship
 Performance of the Night (One time)

Mixed martial arts record

|- 
|Win
|align=center|12–3
|Dalcha Lungiambula
|TKO (punches)
|UFC 282
|
|align=center|2
|align=center|4:41
|Las Vegas, Nevada, United States
|
|-
|Loss
|align=center|11–3
|Nassourdine Imavov
|TKO (elbows)
|UFC 268
|
|align=center|2
|align=center|4:42
|New York City, New York, United States
|
|-
|Loss
|align=center|11–2
|Jack Hermansson
|Decision (unanimous)
|UFC Fight Night: Font vs. Garbrandt
|
|align=center|3
|align=center|5:00
|Las Vegas, Nevada, United States
|
|-
|Loss
|align=center|11–1
|Derek Brunson
|TKO (punches)
|UFC Fight Night: Brunson vs. Shahbazyan
|
|align=center|3
|align=center|0:26
|Las Vegas, Nevada, United States
|
|-
|Win
|align=center|11–0
|Brad Tavares
|KO (head kick)
|UFC 244
|
|align=center|1
|align=center|2:27
|New York City, New York, United States
|
|-
| Win
| align=center|10–0
| Jack Marshman
| Submission (rear-naked choke)
| UFC 239
| 
| align=center|1
| align=center|1:12
| Las Vegas, Nevada, United States
|
|-
| Win
| align=center|9–0
| Charles Byrd
| TKO (elbows and punches)
| UFC 235
| 
| align=center|1
| align=center|0:38
| Las Vegas, Nevada, United States
|
|-
| Win
| align=center|8–0
| Darren Stewart
| Decision (split)
| The Ultimate Fighter: Heavy Hitters Finale
| 
| align=center| 3
| align=center| 5:00
| Las Vegas, Nevada, United States
|
|-
| Win
| align=center|7–0
| Antonio Jones
| TKO (punches)
| Dana White's Contender Series 13
| 
| align=center|1
| align=center|0:40
| Las Vegas, Nevada, United States
|
|-
| Win
| align=center|6–0
| Daniel McWilliams
| TKO (punches)
| CXF 12
| 
| align=center|1
| align=center|0:30
| Burbank, California, United States
|
|-
| Win
| align=center|5–0
| Aaron Hamilton
| TKO (punches)
| CXF 11
| 
| align=center|1
| align=center|1:08
| Los Angeles, California, United States
|
|-
| Win
| align=center|4–0
| Anthony Thomas
| TKO (punches)
| Gladiator Challenge: Fight Club
| 
| align=center|1
| align=center|0:14
| El Cajon, California, United States
|
|-
| Win
| align=center|3–0
| Dejon Daniels
| TKO (punches)
| CXF 8
| 
| align=center|1
| align=center|2:58
| Burbank, California, United States
|
|-
| Win
| align=center|2–0
| Dearmie Street
| TKO (punches)
| CXF 7
| 
| align=center|1
| align=center|3:16
| Los Angeles, California, United States
|
|-
| Win
| align=center|1–0
| Selah Williams
| TKO (head kick and punches)
| CXF 6
| 
| align=center|1
| align=center|0:43
| Los Angeles, California, United States
|

References

External links
 
 

1997 births
Living people
American male mixed martial artists
Middleweight mixed martial artists
Ultimate Fighting Championship male fighters
American people of Armenian descent
Sportspeople from Glendale, California
Mixed martial artists from California
Mixed martial artists utilizing Shotokan
American male karateka